Amelacanthus is an extinct genus of cartilaginous fish from the Paleozoic era. It is known from fin spines and currently contains four described species. It is known from the Permian and Carboniferous of North America, Europe, and Africa. It is also known from the Famennian of Russia.

References

Cartilaginous fish
Prehistoric cartilaginous fish genera